Van Gelder is a Dutch toponymic surname meaning "from/of Guelders", a county and later duchy in the Low Countries. People with the name include:

Anna van Gelder (1614–1687), wife of the Dutch admiral Michiel de Ruyter
Arne Van Gelder (born 1997), Belgian acrobatic gymnast
Cornelia van Gelder (1904–1969), Dutch swimmer
David van Gelder (born 1940), Israeli fencer
Dora van Gelder (1904–1999), Dutch-born American writer, psychic, alternative healer
Edwin van Gelder (born 1978), Dutch graphic designer and art director
Geert Jan van Gelder (born 1947), Dutch Arabist
Gordon Van Gelder (born 1966), American science fiction editor
Hendrik Arend van Gelder (1825–1899), Dutch Mennonite teacher and minister
J.H. van Gelder (1887–1969), Dutch pediatrician and art collector
Jack van Gelder (born 1950), Dutch sports commentator and television presenter
Jan Gerrit van Gelder (1903–1980), Dutch art historian
Julie Van Gelder (born 1993), Belgian acrobatic gymnast
Lawrence Van Gelder (1933–2016), American journalist and magazine editor
Leslie Van Gelder (born 1969), American archaeologist and writer
 (1872-1943), Dutch impresario
Max van Gelder (1924–2019), Dutch water polo player
Nicolaes van Gelder (1636–1676), Dutch still life painter
Peter van Gelder (born 1940), sitarist and educator
Richard Van Gelder (1928–1994), American mammalogist and museum curator
Rudy Van Gelder (1924–2016), American music recording engineer
Tim van Gelder (born 1960s), Australian software engineer
Tinus van Gelder (1911–1991), Dutch track cyclist
Yuri van Gelder (born 1983), Dutch gymnast

See also
Van Galder, surname
Gelder (disambiguation)
, Dutch company that has manufactured paper since 1685
Van Gelder Studio, recording studio in New Jersey established by Rudy Van Gelder
Van Gelder's bat, Central American bat discovered by Richard Van Gelder
HNLMS Jan van Gelder, Dutch navy vessel
Van Gelderen, Dutch surname of the same origin

References

Dutch-language surnames
Surnames of Dutch origin
Toponymic surnames

de:Van Gelder
nl:Van Gelder